The  Junction and Breakwater Trail is a  long rail trail located on the southwestern side of Cape Henlopen State Park connecting Lewes and Rehoboth Beach, Delaware, United States. It is the third rail trail built in Delaware and it is the longest in the state. It partially follows the former Pennsylvania Railroad Rehoboth Beach branch that once transported passengers to several Methodist resort camps along the Atlantic coast. The line was abandoned by the Penn Central in the early 1970s.

The Junction and Breakwater Trail is named after the former railroad line between Lewes and Rehoboth in the mid-19th century. The first  of the trail was opened in December 2003 after acquiring parcels and easements from private landowners. On June 4, 2007, an additional  were added, extending the trail to Kings Highway in Lewes. Plans are being discussed to extend the trail further into town.

Notes

External links
 Map

Rail trails in Delaware
Protected areas of Sussex County, Delaware
Protected areas established in 2003
National Recreation Trails in Delaware